Odder RK is a Danish rugby club in Odder. They currently play in DRU Division One East. The clubs forms part of the Odder Idræts- og Gymnastik Forening (Odder Sports and Gymnastics Club).

History
The club was founded in 1996.

External links
 Odder RK

Rugby clubs established in 1996
Danish rugby union teams
1996 establishments in Denmark